{{Infobox person
| honorific_prefix   = 
| name               = Maha Subair
| honorific_suffix   = 
| image              = 
| image_upright      = 
| birth_name         = Subair Pareed
| birth_date         = 
| birth_place        = Kerala, India
| death_date         = 
| death_place        = 
| death_cause        = 
| nationality        = Indian
| education          = 
| alma_mater         = 
| occupation         = Film producer
| years_active       = 1987 - present
| era                = 
| employer           = 
| organization       = 
| known_for          = 
| notable_works      = {{ubl|Meesa Madhavan|Manassinakkare|Thirakkatha|Christian Brothers}}
| spouse             = 
| children           = 
| parents            = 
| mother             = 
| father             = 
| awards             = 
| signature          = 
| signature_size     = 
| signature_alt      = 
| footnotes          = 
}}
Maha Subair, born Subair Pareed, is an Indian film producer, predominantly working in Malayalam films. He is associated with Varna Chithra and has produced a number of films such as Meesa Madhavan, Manassinakkare, Thirakkatha, Christian Brothers'', the first mentioned being the highest grossing film in the year of its release.

Filmography

Awards and honours

See also 

 Antony Perumbavoor
 P. K. R. Pillai
 G.P. Vijayakumar

References

Further reading

External links 
 
 
 

Indian film producers
Malayalam film producers
Tamil film producers
People from Kerala
Malayali people
Kerala State Film Award winners
Filmfare Awards South winners
Film producers from Kerala
Film people from Kerala
Year of birth missing (living people)
Living people